, is a French-Japanese actress, director and former model.

Early life
Noémie Nakai was born on December 2, 1990 in Tokyo, Japan. She has a French mother and a Japanese father. She took acting lessons when she was very young in France, and arrived by chance in modeling by shooting for advertisements in order to follow her friends. In 2013, she got her first real acting role in the drama Shûden Bye Bye. Nakai is a graduate of the Lycée International de Saint-Germain-en-Laye in France and Keio University in Japan. She also studied at the University of Nottingham in England.

Career
On the eve of her thirties, she won the Busan Award in October 2019 as a director in the Asian Project Market section (co-production platform allowing emerging directors to meet market professionals on an international level) of the Busan International Film Festival for the Topography of Solitude project.

Her short film Tears Teacher spotted at the Hot Docs Festival was acquired by the Op Docs section of The New York Times. This ten-minute documentary is dedicated to Hidefumi Yoshida, a teacher who has been a tear therapy practitioner since 2015, who organizes meetings where men and women cry bitterly and anonymously write down painful episodes of their lives. “Emotional outbursts” are frowned upon in Japan. Tears Teacher was selected in the short documentary category of the 2021 Sundance Festival available for streaming on the New York Times website.

In 2022, Noémie Nakai played Luna in Tokyo Vice, a television series for HBO Max directed by Michael Mann.

Art studies
 Le Cours Simon in Paris (2004-2008)
 School of Le Vésinet in France (2001-2004)
 Music production on the Isle of Wight in England (2002-2003)
 Singing class / voice exercises in Tokyo
 Dance class (ballet, modern dance)

Personal life
In 2018, Nakai moved to London to pursue director opportunities and splits her time between England and Japan.

Filmography
Noémie Nakai starred in a dozen films and TV series.

Film

Television

Video games

Music videos
 Koda Kumi - "Slow" feat. Omarion (2020)
 V6
 (2012) Music video for Rabbit "Nikki"
 Rottengraffty

Appearance

Advertisements
 Astalift
 McDonald's
 Peach John
 Shiseido
 (2012) TV Commercial for Matsumoto Kiyoshi Argelan organic shampoo (Tokyo, Japan)
 (2014) TV Commercial for GU
 (2014) TV commercial for Morinaga Mashbon
 (2014) Advertisement for United Arrows
 (2014) Advertisement for Grand Hyatt Fukuoka
 (2014) TV Commercial for Laforet - Summer sale

Magazines
 Akasugu
 Snowgirl
 Volt
 Zexy

Model 
 (2011) Sony Tablet S - Model
 (2012) Commercial for Ridez 2012 S/S - Model
 (2013) Commercial for Emobile - Model (Tokyo, Japan)
 (2013) Prints ads for Victorian House Reintei Weddings (Kobe, Japan)
 (2013) Print ads for Vernal make-up brand.

Radio 
 (2013) "Hello world" radio emission on J-Wave- Guest (Tokyo, Japan)

References 

1990 births
Living people
Actresses from Tokyo
Japanese film directors
21st-century Japanese actresses
Japanese people of French descent
People from Tokyo
Models from Tokyo Metropolis